Khotinsky Uyezd (Хотинский уезд) was one of the subdivisions of the Bessarabia Governorate of the Russian Empire. It was situated in the northwestern part of the governorate. Its administrative centre was Khotyn (Khotin).

Demographics
At the time of the Russian Empire Census of 1897, Khotinsky Uyezd had a population of 307,532. Of these, 53.2% spoke Ukrainian, 23.8% Romanian, 15.6% Yiddish, 5.8% Russian, 0.7% Polish, 0.5% Belarusian and 0.2% German as their native language.

References

 
Uezds of Bessarabia Governorate
Bessarabia Governorate